Kwadwo Antwi Duah (born 24 February 1997) is a Swiss professional footballer who plays as an attacking midfielder for 1. FC Nürnberg.

Club career 
Duah is a youth product from BSC Young Boys. He made his Swiss Super League debut on 30 July 2016 against FC Lugano, replacing Yoric Ravet after 78 minutes.

On 24 June 2022, Duah signed with 2. Bundesliga club 1. FC Nürnberg.

Personal life
Duah was born in London, England, and moved to Switzerland at a young age. He is of Ghanaian descent, and holds dual citizenship with Ghana and Switzerland.

References

1997 births
Living people
Swiss people of Ghanaian descent
English people of Ghanaian descent
Footballers from Greater London
Swiss men's footballers
English footballers
Association football midfielders
Switzerland youth international footballers
Swiss Super League players
Swiss Challenge League players
BSC Young Boys players
Neuchâtel Xamax FCS players
FC Winterthur players
Servette FC players
FC Wil players
FC St. Gallen players
1. FC Nürnberg players
Swiss expatriate footballers
Expatriate footballers in Germany
Swiss expatriate sportspeople in Germany